Patricia "Trish" Flavel (née Whittaker) (born 15 January 1976) is an Australian Paralympic athlete with an intellectual disability.

She was born in the Melbourne suburb of Box Hill.  She won the Women's U19 1500 m at the 1994 Australian All Schools Championships.  At the 2000 Sydney Games, she won a bronze medal in the Women's 800 m T20 athletics event. She was an Australian Institute of Sport Athlete with a Disability scholarship holder from 1999 to 2000.

She is married to Australian Paralympic athlete Anton Flavel.

References

External links
 Trish Flavel - Athletics Australia Results

1976 births
Living people
Paralympic athletes of Australia
Athletes (track and field) at the 2000 Summer Paralympics
Intellectual Disability category Paralympic competitors
Paralympic bronze medalists for Australia
Australian Institute of Sport Paralympic track and field athletes
Sportswomen from Victoria (Australia)
Australian female middle-distance runners
Australian female long-distance runners
Medalists at the 2000 Summer Paralympics
Athletes from Melbourne
Competitors in athletics with intellectual disability
Paralympic medalists in athletics (track and field)
21st-century Australian women
20th-century Australian women
People from Box Hill, Victoria
Australian Institute of Sport track and field athletes